Petria Rennie (born 17 June 1987) is a former association football player who represented New Zealand at international level.

Rennie represented New Zealand U-20 at the 2006 FIFA U-20 Women's World Championship in Russia, playing two group games.

Rennie has made a single appearance for Football Ferns in a 0–6 loss to Japan on 21 May 2005.

References

External links

1987 births
Living people
New Zealand women's international footballers
New Zealand women's association footballers
Women's association football defenders